The Garrett Park Historic District is a national historic district located at Garrett Park, Montgomery County, Maryland. It's a  residential community incorporated in 1891, along the B & O Railroad. The older community includes a number of late Victorian homes.

It was listed on the National Register of Historic Places in 1975.

References

External links
, including photo in 2003, at Maryland Historical Trust website
Boundary Map of the Garrett Park Historic District, Montgomery County, at Maryland Historical Trust
Historic American Buildings Survey documentation, filed under Garrett Park, Montgomery, MD:

Garrett Park, Maryland
Historic districts on the National Register of Historic Places in Maryland
Historic districts in Montgomery County, Maryland
Historic American Buildings Survey in Maryland
National Register of Historic Places in Montgomery County, Maryland